Logtown may refer to:
Logtown, California, former name of Mariposa, California
Logtown, New York
Logtown, Pennsylvania, former name of Penns Park, Pennsylvania